Maadan Subdistrict or Maadan Nahiyah  is a Syrian Nahiyah (Subdistrict) located in Raqqa District in Raqqa.  According to the Syria Central Bureau of Statistics (CBS), Maadan Subdistrict had a population of 42,652 in the 2004 census.

References 

Subdistricts of Raqqa Governorate